KYUU-LD (channel 35) is a low-power television station in Boise, Idaho, United States, affiliated with The CW Plus. It is owned by Sinclair Broadcast Group alongside CBS affiliate KBOI-TV (channel 2). Both stations share studios on North 16th Street in downtown Boise, while KYUU-LD's transmitter is located at the Bogus Basin ski area summit in unincorporated Boise County.

In addition to its own digital signal, KYUU-LD is simulcast in 720p high definition on KBOI-TV's second digital subchannel (2.2, hence the Treasure Valley CW 2.2 branding) from the same transmitter site.

History
The station signed on November 10, 1993 with the call sign K66EV and airing an analog signal on UHF channel 66. Until mid-December 2008, it was affiliated with the Spanish-language network Telefutura as K35GE, later KUNB-LP and broadcasting on channel 35. The station then began to simulcast sister station KBCI-TV (now KBOI-TV) until July 1, 2009, when it joined the Retro Television Network; the KYUU-LP call letters were assigned on June 10. At one point in time, the station was listed as a Univision affiliate but has never been affiliated with that network.

On September 12, 2011, KYUU-LP became Boise's CW affiliate, with RTV programming moving to a subchannel on ABC affiliate KIVI-TV (channel 6). At some point in 2012, KYUU-LP shut down its analog signal and started broadcasting in digital on channel 28, using 35.1 for its PSIP. On April 11, 2013, Fisher Communications announced that it would sell its properties, including KYUU-LD, to the Sinclair Broadcast Group. The deal was completed on August 8, 2013.

Technical information

Subchannels
The station's digital signal is multiplexed:

See also
Channel 2 branded TV stations in the United States
Channel 28 digital TV stations in the United States
Channel 28 low-power TV stations in the United States
Channel 35 virtual TV stations in the United States

References

External links

Low-power television stations in the United States
Television channels and stations established in 1993
1993 establishments in Idaho
The CW affiliates
TBD (TV network) affiliates
Comet (TV network) affiliates
Stadium (sports network) affiliates
Dabl affiliates
YUU-LD
Sinclair Broadcast Group